Gaudin Point is the eastern entrance point of Lauzanne Cove, Flandres Bay, on the Danco Coast of Antarctica. It was first charted by the French Antarctic Expedition, 1903–05, under Jean-Baptiste Charcot. In association with the names of pioneers of photography in this area, the point was named by the UK Antarctic Place-Names Committee (1977) after Marc Antoine Gaudin, a French photographer who took the first instantaneous photographs of moving objects in 1841.

References

Headlands of Graham Land
Danco Coast